Mijares is municipality located in the province of Ávila, Castile and León, Spain.

Mijares may refer to:

Places 

 Mijares (river), Spain
 Alto Mijares, comarca in the province of Castellón, Valencian Community, Spain

People 

 Carlos Mijares Bracho (1930–2015), Mexican architect
 Cristian Mijares (born 1981), Mexican boxer
 Emil Mijares (1935–2007), Filipino jazz musician
 José Mijares (born 1984), Venezuelan baseball player
 Luke Mijares, Filipino singer
 Manuel Mijares (born 1958), Mexican singer
 Martha Mijares (1938–2018), Mexican actress
 Omar Mijares (b. 1938), Venezuelan wrestler
 Rafael Mijares Alcérreca (born 1924), Mexican architect and painter